John Ringo or Johnny Ringo may refer to:

People 
 John Ringo (born 1963), American author
 Johnny Ringo (1850–1882), American Old West outlaw who was murdered
 Johnny Ringo (musician) (1961–2005), Jamaican reggae deejay

Other uses 
 "Johnny Ringo", third episode of the 1966 Doctor Who serial The Gunfighters
 Johnny Ringo (TV series), a Western television series

Ringo, Johnny